Bollons Seamount or Bollons Tablemount is a seamount just east of the international date line, a few hundred miles off the coast of New Zealand. It represents a continental fragment that separated from Zealandia as a result of rifting.
The seamount was involved in a 2002 survey and collection project defined to find the edge of New Zealand's continental shelf. The Bollons Seamount has been shown to be a site of extensive Cretaceous-era rifting in the area towards the southern Chatham Rise between 83.7 and 78.5 MYA.

A  gap near the seamount, known as the Ballons gap, is interpreted as being due to excess volcanism from the seafloor spreading process. A ridge just south of the seamount, the Antipodes Fracture Zone, is interpreted as having been built by a combination of compression and volcanic activity associated with the triple-junction Bellingshausen-Marie Byrd Land plate boundary nearby.

References

External links
Bollons Seamount at the Seamount database published by Earthref, a National Science Foundation project

Seamounts of the Pacific Ocean
Geography of the New Zealand seabed
Continental fragments
Seamounts of New Zealand